Dmitry Medvedev's Second Cabinet was the composition of the Russian government from 18 May 2018 to 15 January 2020 under the leadership of Prime Minister Dmitry Medvedev.

The Cabinet resigned on 15 January 2020, in response to significant constitutional changes suggested by Vladimir Putin regarding shifting power away from the presidency. However on Putin's instructions the Cabinet continued its work as a caretaker cabinet. As it was announced Dmitry Medvedev voluntarily resigned, but formally, according to the Executive Order Dmitry Medvedev was sacked from his position by Putin without Medvedev's offer.

Formation
The government began to form after Vladimir Putin's inauguration on 7 May 2018, when Putin nominated Medvedev as Prime Minister. On the same day, United Russia decided to support Medvedev. Since United Russia had more than half of the seats in the State Duma, this means Medvedev would become Prime Minister even if all other parties opposed him. On 8 May, the Liberal Democratic Party also expressed support for Dmitry Medvedev and nominated six candidates for Ministerial posts. On the same day, after a meeting with Dmitry Medvedev, the Communist Party and A Just Russia refused to support Medvedev.

For the first time since 1991 candidates for Deputy Prime Ministers were nominated before the hearings in the State Duma.

State Duma confirmation

On 8 May, Dmitry Medvedev was confirmed by the State Duma as Prime Minister.

Structure and composition
On 15 May, Dmitry Medvedev presented to President Vladimir Putin a draft structure of the Cabinet. Thus Ministry of Education and Science was divided into the Ministry of Education and the Ministry of Science and Higher Education.The Ministry of Communications and Mass Media was renamed to the Ministry of Digital Development, Communications and Mass Media. In addition it was established that the Prime Minister would have ten deputies. On the same day Putin signed a decree "On the Structure of Federal Executive Bodies".

On 18 May 2018, Dmitry Medvedev presented the composition of the Cabinet, and on the same day Putin approved the composition.

In general almost a third of the composition of the government was changed. Their posts retained 13 members. Four people who were in the previous Cabinet remained in the government and took new positions. Two were past members of the government and returned to the government after a break. The remaining 12 members of the government were new to their positions.

Subsequent changes
On 26 February 2019, the Ministry for Development of the Russian Far East was renamed to the Ministry for Development of the Russian Far East and Arctic.

Resignation

Medvedev, along with his entire Cabinet resigned on 15 January 2020, after President Vladimir Putin delivered the Presidential Address to the Federal Assembly, in which he proposed several amendments to the constitution. Medvedev stated that he was resigning to allow President Putin to make the significant constitutional changes suggested by Putin regarding shifting power away from the presidency. Medvedev said that the constitutional changes would "significantly change Russia's balance of power". Putin accepted the resignation. However on Putin's instructions, the Cabinet continued its work as a caretaker cabinet until the formation of a new government.

Composition

References

External links

Medvedev 2
2018 establishments in Russia
Dmitry Medvedev
Medvedev
Medvedev